Christian Eyenga Moenge (born June 22, 1989) is a Congolese professional basketball player for Montakit Fuenlabrada of the Liga ACB. Eyenga was drafted by the Cleveland Cavaliers with the 30th pick in that year's 2009 NBA draft. When drafted, he played for the Spanish Third Division club Prat, an affiliate of the ACB club DKV Joventut.

Professional career

NBA career
Eyenga played the 2010 NBA Summer League for the Cleveland Cavaliers. After that, he officially signed a two-year contract with the Cavaliers on July 23, 2010. He signed for $2 million over two years, with years three and four being options. On November 18, Eyenga was sent to the Cavaliers' NBA Development League affiliate, the Erie BayHawks. On January 2, he was recalled by the Cavs and made his debut on the same day, against the Dallas Mavericks. He scored 4 points and grabbed 3 rebounds.

On March 15, 2012, Eyenga was traded along with Ramon Sessions to the Los Angeles Lakers for a protected first round pick in the 2012 NBA draft, Jason Kapono and Luke Walton.

On August 10, 2012, Eyenga was traded to the Orlando Magic.

On October 23, 2012, Eyenga was waived by the Orlando Magic. He was then drafted by the Texas Legends of the NBA D-League. On January 4, 2013, Eyenga was released by the Legends so he could sign in China. In February 2013, he re-joined the Legends after a month in China.

Overseas career
In October 2011 he signed to play for Joventut Badalona in Spain during the 2011 NBA lockout.

In January 2013, he signed with Shanxi Zhongyu of China. He left the same month and returned to America.

On July 25, 2013, Eyenga moved to Poland and signed with Stelmet Zielona Góra. On August 4, 2014, he signed a one-year deal with another Polish team Turów Zgorzelec. In September 2014, Eyenga has been waived by the club. On November 12, 2014, he signed a one-season contract with the Italian Serie A team Pallacanestro Varese.

On July 10, 2015, he signed with champions of Italy, Dinamo Sassari for the 2015–16 season. On February 5, 2016, he left Dinamo Sassari, and signed with Auxilium CUS Torino for the rest of the season.

On August 16, 2016, Eyenga signed with Pallacanestro Varese for the 2016–17 season. On May 14, 2017, he signed with Spanish club Unicaja for the rest of the 2016–17 ACB season.

On July 23, 2017, Eyenga signed with Fuenlabrada for the 2017–18 ACB season. At the end of the season Eyenga won the league award for ACB Most Spectacular Player.

He averaged 9.4 points and 3.9 rebounds per game during the 2019-20 season. On August 4, 2020, Eyenga re-signed with the team. He signed a two-year deal with the team on July 3, 3021.

Career statistics

NBA

Regular season

|-
| align="left" | 
| align="left" | Cleveland
| 44 || 18 || 21.5 || .425 || .275 || .643 || 2.8 || .8 || .8 || .6 || 6.9
|-
| align="left" | 
| align="left" | Cleveland
| 6 || 0 || 13.8 || .158 || .500 || .333 || 2.0 || .7 || .5 || .7 || 0.8
|-
| align="left" | 
| align="left" | L.A. Lakers
| 1 || 0 || 19.0 || .500 || .000 || 1.000 || 2.0 || 1.0 || .0 || 1.0 || 8.0
|- class="sortbottom"
| style="text-align:left;"| Career
| style="text-align:left;"|
| 51 || 18 || 20.6 || .411 || .277 || .611 || 2.7 || .8 || .7 || .6 || 6.3
|}

Playoffs

|-
| align="left" | 2012
| align="left" | L.A. Lakers
| 3 || 0 || 3.0 || .667 || .000 || .000 || .7 || .3 || .3 || .3 || 1.3
|- class="sortbottom"
| style="text-align:left;"| Career
| style="text-align:left;"| 
|  3 || 0 || 3.0 || .667 || .000 || .000 || .7 || .3 || .3 || .3 || 1.3
|}

Euroleague

|-
| style="text-align:left;"| 2008–09
| style="text-align:left;"| DKV Joventut
| 4 || 0 || 4.5 || .250 || .000 || .500 || .0 || .0 || .0 || .3 || .8 || -.3
|-
| style="text-align:left;"| 2013–14
| style="text-align:left;"| Zielona Góra
| 10 || 10 || 27.7 || .459 || .200 || .650 || 4.7 || 1.5 || .5 || .9 || 9.2 || 10.1
|- class="sortbottom"
| style="text-align:left;"| Career
| style="text-align:left;"|
| 14 || 10 || 21.1 || .449 || .200 || .667 || 3.4 || 1.1 || .4 || .7 || 6.8 || 7.1

DR Congo national team
Eyenga often represents the DR Congo national basketball team at international tournaments. At the 2019 FIBA Basketball World Cup qualification, he averaged 14.7 points, 7.0 rebounds and 3.3 assists per game.

References

External links

 Christian Eyenga at acb.com 
 
 Christian Eyenga at euroleague.net
 Christian Eyenga at fiba.com
 Christian Eyenga at legabasket.it 
 

1989 births
Living people
Auxilium Pallacanestro Torino players
Baloncesto Fuenlabrada players
Baloncesto Málaga players
Basket Zielona Góra players
Canton Charge players
CB Prat players
Cleveland Cavaliers draft picks
Cleveland Cavaliers players
Democratic Republic of the Congo expatriate basketball people in Spain
Democratic Republic of the Congo expatriate basketball people in the United States
Democratic Republic of the Congo men's basketball players
Dinamo Sassari players
Erie BayHawks (2008–2017) players
Joventut Badalona players
Lega Basket Serie A players
Liga ACB players
Los Angeles D-Fenders players
Los Angeles Lakers players
National Basketball Association players from the Democratic Republic of the Congo
Pallacanestro Varese players
Power forwards (basketball)
Basketball players from Kinshasa
Shanxi Loongs players
Small forwards
Texas Legends players
21st-century Democratic Republic of the Congo people